Al Kamlin (also known as El Kamlin) is a district of Al Jazirah state, Sudan.

References

Districts of Sudan